The 2018–19 UCLA Bruins men's basketball team represented the University of California, Los Angeles during the 2018–19 NCAA Division I men's basketball season. The Bruins played their home games at Pauley Pavilion as members in the Pac-12 Conference. They were led by sixth-year head coach Steve Alford until he was fired mid-season and assistant Murry Bartow was named the interim head coach. Their lineup featured three former McDonald's All-Americans: sophomores Jaylen Hands and Kris Wilkes were both named second-team All-Pac-12, while first-year player Moses Brown was voted to the Pac-12 All-Freshman Team. UCLA finished the season 17–16, and lost in the second round of the Pac-12 tournament. They missed the postseason for the second time in four years.

Ranked No. 21 in the preseason AP Poll, the Bruins began the season 4–0 and climbed to No. 17. However, they lost six of the next nine and finished with a 7–6 record in nonconference play, closing it out with four straight losses, the last of which was a 73–58 defeat to Liberty. They committed a season-high 24 turnovers in the game, and the 15-point setback was the most lopsided home loss in Alford's tenure with UCLA. Combined with an earlier home loss to mid-major program Belmont, it was the first time the Bruins had lost consecutive home games to non-Power Five schools since 2012–13. Four days after Belmont, they lost by 29 at Cincinnati, their largest margin of defeat since 2014–15. UCLA had not lost four straight since the end of 2015–16, when they finished the season under .500. They had not suffered four consecutive nonconference losses since 2010–11. On December 31, 2018, two days after the Bruins' loss to Liberty, UCLA fired Alford and named Bartow the interim head coach.

The Bruins were inconsistent under Bartow, logging as many three-game winning streaks as three-game losing streaks. They opened conference play 2–0 at home against San Francisco Bay Area schools Stanford and California. Emphasizing the team's speed and athleticism, he had the Bruins play more aggressive, trapping and applying pressure on defense and attacking on offense by running on both missed and made baskets. Six Bruins scored in double figures against Cal after five reached the threshold against the Cardinal. In their 13 non-conference games under Alford, UCLA never had more than four double-figure scorers. The Bruins won the following game in overtime 87–84 at Oregon after rallying from 17 points down with less than seven minutes left in the second half, and later trailing by nine with 51 seconds remaining. It was the largest comeback in the final minute of a Pac-12 game and tied the sixth-largest deficit overcome in the last minute in Division I history. UCLA's 3–0 start in the conference was their best since starting 5–0 in the Pac-12 in 2012–13, the last time they claimed a conference regular-season title. However, they lost their next three games, falling to 3–7 in their last 10, and 10–9 overall. After wins over Arizona and Washington State, during which they set season-highs in field goal percentage of 57.9 and 58.8 percent, respectively, they lost to Washington after committing 23 turnovers. The Bruins were 5–4 halfway through the conference schedule. While Bartow was pushing for a faster pace, an unintended consequence was UCLA's conference-leading 17.3 turnovers per game, almost four more than they committed during non-conference play.

Entering the second half, UCLA had a favorable schedule with seven of their last nine regular-season games against schools that were ranked in the bottom half of the Pac-12. However, they lost their third straight game on February 9 after blowing a 22-point lead with 12:10 remaining in a 93–92 loss to Utah, which won on a buzzer-beating three-point field goal. The Bruins allowed 61 points in the second half, the most they had surrendered in a half since allowing 64 points in a win against Cal State Northridge in 1998. The Bruins dropped into a four-way tie for seventh place in the Pac-12. Combined with a loss earlier in the week to Colorado, it was the first time that UCLA had been swept in a home series since 2015–16. However, UCLA won four of their next five. The four wins consisted of two overtime games, a one-point victory, and a 19-point comeback. They entered the final week of the regular season with a chance to finish as high as third place in the conference, but lost their final two games to fall to seventh.

In their opening game of the Pac-12 tournament, UCLA switched to a man-to-man defense after having played predominantly zone under Bartow, and they defeated Stanford 79–72. Bruins freshman guard David Singleton broke his foot in the final minute, ending his season. The Bruins lost their next game 83–72 to second-seeded Arizona State in the quarterfinals. They were down by two points with 3:59 remaining before halftime. However, they were outscored 14–0 to end the half, and trailed by double-digits throughout most of the rest of the game. Afterwards, Bartow stated that he was not interested in having his interim tag removed, and expressed optimism that UCLA would "hire a very good coach".

Previous season

The Bruins finished the 2017–18 season 21–12, 11–7 in Pac-12 play to finish in a three-way tie for third place. They defeated Stanford in the quarterfinals of the Pac-12 tournament to advance to the semifinals where they lost to Arizona. They received an at-large bid to the NCAA tournament where they lost in the First Four to St. Bonaventure.

Off-season

Departures

2018 recruiting class

Roster

Schedule and results

|-
!colspan=12 style=| Exhibition

|-
!colspan=12 style=| Non–conference regular season

|-
!colspan=12 style=|  Pac-12 regular season

|-
!colspan=12 style=| Pac-12 Tournament

Rankings

*AP does not release post-NCAA Tournament rankings^Coaches did not release a Week 2 poll.

Honors
 Jaylen Hands, Pac-12 Men's Basketball Player of the Week (March 4, 2019)
 All-Pac-12
Jaylen Hands, Second team
Kris Wilkes, Second team
 Moses Brown, Honorable-mention Pac-12 All-Defensive Team
 Moses Brown, Pac-12 All-Freshman

References

External links

2018–19 UCLA Bruins Roster and Stats at Sports-Reference.com

UCLA Bruins men's basketball seasons
UCLA
UCLA Bruins basketball, men
UCLA Bruins basketball, men
UCLA Bruins basketball, men
UCLA Bruins basketball, men